The 2023 ACCR Formula 4 Championship will be the first season of the ACCR Formula 4 Championship, a motor racing series for the Central Europe regulated according to FIA Formula 4 regulations, and organised and promoted by the Automobile Club of the Czech Republic (ACCR) and Krenek Motorsport.

It will commence on 8 April at Motorsport Arena Oschersleben in Germany and conclude on 10 September at Brno Circuit in the Czech Republic.

Teams and drivers

Race calendar and results 
The provisional calendar featuring six round across five countries was published on 3 November 2022. All rounds, except for the Slovakiaring one supporting the European Truck Racing Championship, will be a part of the ESET Cup package.

Notes

References

External links 

 

ACCR
ACCR
ACCR
ACCR
ACCR
ACCR
ACCR F4
ACCR F4